Isaberrysaura is a genus of stegosaurian ornithischian dinosaur from the Middle Jurassic Los Molles Formation of Patagonia, Argentina. The genus contains a single species, I. mollensis, described by Salgado et al. in 2017 from a single specimen. Although initially classified as a basal neornithischian, subsequent analysis has allied it with the Stegosauria; the morphology of its skull resembles those of other members of the group.

Description 
The teeth of Isaberrysaura are heterodont, with recurved premaxillary teeth and lanceolate maxillary and dentary teeth. In extant iguanid lizards, similar dentition is correlated with omnivorous diets, indicating that Isaberrysaura might too have been omnivorous.

The skull in particular is very unusual; it is estimated to be 52 cm long and 20 cm wide across the orbits, and it is almost as high as it is wide. The snout slopes anteroventrally from the posterodorsal corner of the infratemporal fenestra to what is seemingly the maxillary-premaxillary contact and the infratemporal fenestra is dorsoventrally deep. In contrast, the orbit is subcircular, not quite as dorsoventrally tall as anteroposteriorly long, smaller than the infratemporal fenestra, and only visible in lateral view. The anterolateral sector of the left supratemporal fenestra is relatively well preserved and it is visible only in dorsal view. The skull's antorbital fossa is roughly triangular, with its base longer than the other two sides. The jugal is triradiate and the anterior process of the jugal forms the posteroventral corner of the antorbital fossa and surpasses anteriorly the base of the lacrimal, a feature seen in basal thyreophorans and stegosaurs. The dorsal process of the jugal is proportionally long. The quadratojugal is very broad and the premaxilla is incompletely preserved while the post-cranial material is as-yet-undescribed at present. The dentition is heterodont, with six premaxillary teeth and thirty maxillary teeth. The genus' overall appearance is highly similar to that of stegosaurians, though lacking the characteristic plates and likely possessing a bipedal stance.

Discovery 
 
The holotype specimen of Isaberrysaura was discovered in the marine to deltaic sediments of the Los Molles Formation, which is of Bajocian age, by Isabel Valdivia Berry, who is honoured in the generic name. The holotype, known as MOZ-Pv 6459 consists of a partial skeleton with a nearly complete skull (the post-cranial material of which is still unprepared), six cervical vertebrae, fifteen dorsal vertebrae, a sacrum with a partial ilium and an apparently complete pubis, nine caudal vertebrae, part of a scapula, ribs, with the addition of unidentifiable fragments.

Classification 
Isaberrysaura's classification is problematic at best; the holotype specimen shares traits with both thyreophorans and neornithischians. For this reason, it has been placed in the Genasauria. Three datasets within the same study by Salgado et al indicated that while it possessed the characteristics of the neornithischians and thyreophorans, it did not fit within either of those groups, representing a previously unknown morphotype within the Ornithischia as a whole. Subsequently, the phylogenetic analysis conducted by Han et al. (2018) recovered Isaberrysaura as one of the basalmost known stegosaurs.

Paleobiology  
 
The holotype specimen of Isaberrysaura has been preserved with fossilized stomach contents. Within the rib cage, a mass of fossilized seeds was discovered; the first preserved meal uncovered in a basal ornithischian. Two types of seeds were recovered close to the posterior ribs of Isaberrysaura, distinguished according to their size. The largest seeds preserved three layers: an outer fleshy sarcotesta, the sclerotesta, and the inner layer (possibly corresponding to the nucellus). These seeds are cycadales of the family Zamiineae on the basis of a well-defined coronula in the micropylar region, whereas the smaller, platyspermic seeds are still indeterminate. The intact nature of the sarcotesta in the largest seeds suggests that Isaberrysaura swallowed the seeds whole without chewing and that they were in the first stages of digestion based on their position in the gut. Based on its teeth, it is possible that the dinosaur had an omnivorous diet, but as no trace of animal remains have been found alongside the seeds, this remains speculative at best. It also remains possible that there were enzyme-producing bacteria present in the dinosaur's gut to aid in digesting tougher plant material as seeds.

See also 

 2017 in archosaur paleontology

References 

Thyreophorans
Ornithischian genera
Bajocian life
Middle Jurassic dinosaurs of South America
Jurassic Argentina
Fossils of Argentina
Neuquén Basin
Fossil taxa described in 2017
†